Pakistan Herald Limited, doing business as the Dawn Media Group, is a Pakistani media company based in Karachi, Sindh, Pakistan. It publishes the Dawn newspaper and operates a TV channel, radio stations and websites. It is a listed member of All Pakistan Newspapers Society.

Although it has faced tough competition from the Jang Group, it has still managed to remain popular. The group is headed by the Pakistani media mogul Hameed Haroon, its current CEO.

Ownership 
The Karachi based group is owned by the powerful Haroon and Saigol families. The CEO is Hameed Haroon, and its chairman is Amber Haroon Saigol, daughter of the previous chairman Mahmoud Haroon and the 11th richest individual in Pakistan in 1993. A list of the top 10 richest families in Pakistan ranks Saigol family as the 8th richest and the Haroon's the 16th richest as of 2015.

Structure 
The Dawn Media Group covers three areas: print media (organised as a separate division called Dawn Group of Newspapers), broadcast media, and internet media:
 Print media
 Dawn, its flagship daily English newspaper
 The Star, Pakistan's most popular evening newspaper
 Herald, a current affairs monthly magazine in English
 Spider, a monthly Internet magazine
 Aurora, a marketing and advertising bi-monthly magazine
 Young World, children's monthly magazine
 Broadcast media
 Dawn News, 24-hour news channel, broadcasting in English 2007–2010, but since 2010 in Urdu language
 City FM 89, a music radio channel
 Internet media
Dawn.com, a news website
DawnNews.Tv, news website in Urdu language
Teeli, digital media brand specialised in entertainment programming
Images.Dawn.com, culture and entertainment website
 Exhibitions
 Dawn Education Expo, an annual education festival

'Dawn leaks' controversy 
In 2016, one of the journalists working at Dawn (newspaper), Cyril Almeida, wrote an article led to the controversy called Dawn leaks. Cyril had reported that during the National Security Council (Pakistan) (NSC) meeting between the civilian leaders and the military leaders of Pakistan, some civilian leaders had warned the military leaders about the risk of Pakistan's growing diplomatic isolation due to lack of action against some Pakistani militant groups. Pakistan's military leadership was clearly upset over reports of alleged leaking of this classified information to a Pakistani journalist by some civilian leaders attending that NSC meeting. After the controversy would not die down, Pervaiz Rashid (Minister of Information) and Tariq Fatemi (Special Assistant to the Prime Minister) had to step down as a result of this controversy.

Awards and recognition 
 Hilal-i-Imtiaz Award by the President of Pakistan in 2011 for Hameed Haroon, the CEO of Dawn Media Group

References

External links 
  
Pakistan Herald Publications Limited, company info listed on Pakistan Business Journal website

 
Mass media companies of Pakistan
Urdu-language television channels
Newspapers published in Pakistan
Companies based in Karachi
Newspaper companies of Pakistan